Phyllomya volvulus is a species of fly in the family Tachinidae.

Distribution
Austria, Belgium, Bosnia and Herzegovina, Bulgaria, Croatia, Czech Republic, Denmark, Estonia, Finland, France, Germany, Hungary, Italy, Latvia, Netherlands, Norway, Poland, Romania, Russia, Slovakia, Slovenia, Spain, Sweden, Switzerland, Ukraine, United Kingdom and Yugoslavia

References

Diptera of Europe
Dexiinae
Insects described in 1794
Taxa named by Johan Christian Fabricius